Akkalkuwa is a town and the administrative headquarters of Akkalkuwa taluka of Nandurbar district in Maharashtra state. Akkalkuwa lies in Satpuda range of hills, with Narmada river forming northern boundary. Akarni and Taloda talukas lie on the east while southern and western boundaries are occupied by Gujarat state. Because of the hilly terrain with more than fifty percent area falling under forest. This taluka has no Nagarpalika. Big villages are Khapar and Molgi in this taluka. Population of this town is 17,840(2011).

References

Cities and towns in Nandurbar district
Talukas in Maharashtra